Saša Petricic is a Canadian journalist. He is currently the Asia Correspondent and videojournalist for CBC Television's The National and other CBC News programs, based in Beijing, China. He previously spent four years covering the Middle East.

Education
Petricic attended high school in Toronto, at the North Toronto Collegiate Institute. He went on to earn a journalism degree with combined honours in Soviet and East European Studies from Carleton University. He also studied at Hope College in Michigan and at the University of Quebec.

Career
From 1993 to 2001, Petricic covered federal politics, elections and political issues from the Canadian Parliament in Ottawa. During that time, he contributed various stories and features to BBC News and CNN. He subsequently covered major events and issues from every continent as a CBC correspondent and videojournalist. In 2006, Petricic was the first CBC reporter to file stories from Antarctica. He covered the 2004 Indian Ocean earthquake and tsunami and genocide in Rwanda, the September 11 attacks on the U.S. and Canada's mission in Afghanistan for CBC News.

From 2011 to 2015, Petricic was Middle East Correspondent for The National, based in Jerusalem. He covered the region's Arab Spring uprisings from Egypt, Libya, Syria and Tunisia.

In 2015, Petricic was appointed China Bureau Chief for CBC in Beijing. He followed the rise in power of the Chinese Communist Party leader Xi Jinping and a new, more assertive China. In the region, he covered standoffs between South Korea and North Korea from both countries, pro-democracy protests in Hong Kong, earthquakes in Nepal and typhoons in the Philippines. Petricic chronicled the arrest of Canadians Michael Kovrig, an ex-diplomat, and Michael Spavor, a businessman, by China on espionage charges. He also watched the COVID-19 pandemic spread from Wuhan, Hubei, China from its first days.

Petricic has also taught television journalism at the National University of Rwanda, through the non-profit Rwanda Initiative, and conducted courses in documentary-making at the Canadian Screen Training Centre  and through the London-based organization Raindance. He is a trainer for videojournalists at the CBC.

Petricic has won numerous awards for his work. In 2014, his war coverage of the Syrian conflict from Aleppo and around Syria won Canada's top TV journalism award, the Canadian Screen Award for Best Reportage. Petricic also won the 1999 Canadian Association of Journalists Award for Investigative Journalism and the 2005 Canadian Radio and Television News Directors' Association Award for his work in Rwanda, for a story profiling Canadian Doctor James Orbinski. In August 2008, Petricic received a Gemini Nomination for Best News Feature for his documentary on activities by Christian missionaries in Thailand after the 2004 Indian Ocean earthquake and tsunami.

On June 12, 2013, Petricic was arrested by Turkish forces during the 2013 Gezi Park protests in Turkey while photographing a municipal cleanup crew clearing barricades near Taksim Square in Istanbul. He was released one day later.

References

External links
CBC Biography
Canadian Association of Journalists Fellowship recipients

Canadian television reporters and correspondents
Carleton University alumni
Living people
Canadian people of Serbian descent
Journalists from Ontario
People from Ottawa
Journalists imprisoned in Turkey
Hope College alumni
Canadian Screen Award winning journalists
20th-century Canadian journalists
21st-century Canadian journalists
Year of birth missing (living people)